Malinovka is a rural locality (a settlement) and the administrative center of Belovskoye Rural Settlement, Belgorodsky District, Belgorod Oblast, Russia. The population was 556 as of 2010. There are 11 streets.

References 

Rural localities in Belgorodsky District